"Lay It Down" is a single by American glam metal band Ratt. It was the first single released to promote the group's second album, Invasion of Your Privacy.

Background
The song was co-written by Ratt vocalist Stephen Pearcy, bassist Juan Croucier, and guitarists Robbin Crosby and Warren DeMartini.

It appears in the video game Brütal Legend, during the third battle against Lyonwhyte.

Music video
The music video shows lead singer Stephen Pearcy as a child (played by Whit Hertford) having a birthday party with a young girl sitting next to him. After he makes his birthday wish and blows out the candles, he sees a vision of the future in which his grown-up self and his band plays in what looks like an abandoned building. He sings to his now grown-up girlfriend to win her heart.  The video ends with the girl asking him what he wished for.

The woman in the video is Playboy model Marianne Gravatte, who is also the model on the cover of Invasion Of Your Privacy.

Reception
"Lay It Down" reached No. 40 on the Billboard Hot 100 and No. 11 on the Mainstream Rock chart during the summer of 1985. This made it Ratt's second and last Top 40 Pop hit.

Track listing
"Lay It Down" – 3:23
"Got Me On the Line" – 3:04

Personnel
Stephen Pearcy – Lead vocals
Warren DeMartini – Lead guitar
Robbin Crosby – Lead guitar
Juan Croucier – Bass guitar
Bobby Blotzer – Drums

Charts

References

External links
Lyrics

1985 singles
1985 songs
Ratt songs
Song recordings produced by Beau Hill
Songs written by Juan Croucier
Songs written by Robbin Crosby
Songs written by Stephen Pearcy
Songs written by Warren DeMartini